Elizabeth Atwater (née Emerson; August 8, 1812 – April 11, 1878) was an American botanist.

Background 
Atwater was born in Norwich, Vermont on August 8, 1812. Atwater attended boarding school in Troy Seminary, New York where she began studying plants. Atwater married Samuel T. Atwater in 1839, and moved to Chicago in 1856.

During a visit to Yellowstone National Park in 1873, Atwater collected 2,000 specimens. A new species of moss was later named after her, Bryum atwateriae, by Carl Müller.

Atwater became a notable botanist, corresponding with other famous botanists of this period, including Charles Mohr.

She was on speaking terms with Mary Todd Lincoln after President Lincoln's assassination, and received "a gorgeous, photographic album presented me on last New Years day by Mrs. Lincoln, wife of our martyrd President" (March 36, 1867).

Upon her death she left 30 boxes of botanical specimens to the Chicago Academy of Sciences. A collection of her scrapbooks were rediscovered in 2005 in the basement room of the Chicago Academy of Sciences, however most of her specimens were lost in the Great Chicago Fire of 1871.

References

1812 births
1878 deaths
Scientists from Vermont
People from Norwich, Vermont
19th-century American botanists
American women botanists
19th-century American women scientists
Scientists from Chicago